The Council of Constantinople of 815 was held in the Byzantine capital, in the Hagia Sophia, and initiated the second period of the Byzantine Iconoclasm.

History 
Shortly before it convened, the iconophile Patriarch Nikephoros I was deposed by Emperor Leo V the Armenian in favour of the iconoclast Theodotos I. Theodotos presided over the council, which reinstated iconoclasm, repudiating the Second Council of Nicaea and reaffirming the decisions of the Council of Hieria of 754. Although the meeting had been convened at the behest of the iconoclast Emperor, much of the Iconoclast effort was driven by other clerics, including the later patriarchs Antony I and John VII. In the aftermath of this synod Theodotos is represented as torturing by starvation more than one iconodule abbot in an attempt to force them into agreement with his ecclesiastical policy.

References

Sources 
 

Constantinople,815
Constantinople 815
Byzantine Iconoclasm
815
810s in the Byzantine Empire
815